Taku is  a Japanese restaurant located in Seattle’s Capitol Hill neighborhood at 706 East Pike Street. It is owned by chef Shota Nakajima and was established in 2020. "Taku" ("table" in Japanese) exudes vibes of a lively Osaka alleyway reminiscent of the bustling food stalls in the Shinsekai district with music, lights, dark wood and Japanese-inspired art.

Menu 
Taku’s menu offers marinated, battered and twice-fried karaage nuggets and wings. Additionally, it includes a F*ck it Bucket, chicken karaage rice bowl, a curry karaage burger and a selection of classic Japanese sides like mac salad, furikake fries, cabbage salad and miso soup.

See also
 History of the Japanese in Seattle
 List of Japanese restaurants

References

External links
 

Capitol Hill, Seattle
Japanese restaurants in Seattle